Dhanbad Sadar subdivision is an administrative subdivision of the Dhanbad district in the state of Jharkhand, India.

History
The earliest administrative mention of Dhanbad, refers to the transfer of the headquarters of Gobindapur subdivision of erstwhile Manbhum District to Dhanbaid (as it was then known) in the closing years of the 16th century. Dhanbad district was created in 1956 by carving out the old Dhanbad subdivision and Chas and Chandankiyari police station areas of the Sadar subdivision of Manbhum district, on the recommendations of the States Reorganisation Commission. Initially, the district was split into two subdivisions – Sadar and Baghmara. In 2001, Bokaro district was formed with certain areas of Dhanbad district, which formed Chas subdivision, and Bermo subdivision of Giridih district.

Geography

Dhanbad Sadar subdivision, the only subdivision in the district, can broadly be divided into three natural divisions - the north and north western portions consisting of the hilly region, the uplands containing coal mines and most of the industries and the remaining uplands and plains lying to the south of the Damodar river consisting of culturable flat lands.

Dhanbad Sadar subdivision has two statutory towns namely Dhanbad and Chirkunda and 44 census towns: Hariharpur, Topchanchi, Gomoh, Gunghasa, Matigara, Bhimkanari, Nadkharki, Madhuban, Barora, Dumra, Harina, Muraidih, Rajganj, Mahlidih, Kharkhari, Sahnidih, Malkera, Nagri Kalan, Babua Kalan, Phulwartanr, Jhinghipahari, Mahuda, Gobindpur, Karmatanr, Jangalpur, Pondar Kanali, Sialgudri, Aralgoria, Sansikhara, Bardubhi, Alagdiha, Suranga, Baliapur, Bhamal, Panrra, Nirsa, Marma, Egarkunr, Siuliban, Mera, Maithon, Panchmahali, Dumarkunda and Panchet.

Police stations
Police stations in Dhanbad Sadar subdivision have the following features and jurisdiction:

Blocks
Community development blocks in Dhanbad Sadar subdivision are

.*No information available as of June 2019

Economy

Collieries
A broad area-wise distribution of coalmines of Bharat Coking Coal Limited is given below:

Note: All the linked Area pages provide relevant details of the collieries and carry maps indicating the location of the collieries

.*Except for these seven collieries, all others are located in Dhanbad Sadar subdivision

Education
The following institutions of higher learning and research, including degree colleges, are located in Dhanbad Sadar subdivision:
Indian Institute of Technology (Indian School of Mines), Dhanbad is an Institute of National Importance at Dhanbad. Started as the Indian School of Mines in 1926, it was converted to an Indian Institute of Technology in 2016.
Central Institute of Mining and Fuel Research, a constituent laboratory of Council of Scientific & Industrial Research (CSIR) , is located at Dhanbad. 
Binod Bihari Mahto Koylanchal University was established in 2017 at Dhanbad,
Birsa Institute of Technology Sindri was established in 1949 at Sindri.
Patliputra Medical College and Hospital was established in 1969 at Dhanbad.
SSLNT Women's College (Shree Shree Lakshmi Narayan Trust Mahila Mahavidyalaya) was established in 1955 at Dhanbad.
Guru Nanak College, Dhanbad was established in Dhanbad in 1970.
P. K. Roy Memorial College was established in 1977 at Dhanbad.
Raja Shiva Prasad College was established in 1951 at Bhagatdih, Jharia.
Sindri College was established in 1963 at Sindri.
 Bholaram Shibal Kharkia College, Maithon  was established in 1966 at Maithon.
Ram Sahai More College was established in 1959 at Gobindpur.
Katras College was established at Katras Bazar in 1964.
DAV Mahila College was established in 1973 at Katras. It has a girls hostel with 50 beds,
Koylanchal Sanjay Gandhi Memorial  College was established at Nirsa in 1980.
Baghmara College was established at Bhimkanari, PO Baghmara, in 1985.
Rajganj Degree College was established in 1985 at Dhawachita, Rajganj.
Coalfield College is located at Bhaga, near Jharia.

References

External links

Sub-divisions in Jharkhand